The 1991 Lufthansa Cup German Open was a women's tennis tournament played on outdoor clay courts at the Rot-Weiss Tennis Club in Berlin, Germany for the first time ever after German reunification along with the former East Berlin which was reunited with the former West Berlin and that was part of the Tier I category of the 1991 WTA Tour. It was the 22nd edition of the tournament and was held from 13 May until 20 May 1991. First-seeded Steffi Graf won the singles title, her fifth at the event.

Finals

Singles 

 Steffi Graf defeated  Arantxa Sánchez Vicario 6–3, 4–6, 7–6(8–6)
 It was Graf's 3rd singles title of the year and the 57th of her career.

Doubles 

 Larisa Neiland /  Natasha Zvereva defeated  Nicole Provis /  Elna Reinach 6–3, 6–3

Prize money

References

External links
 ITF tournament edition details
 Tournament draws

Lufthansa Cup
WTA German Open
1991 in German tennis